Breede may refer to:

 Breede, Netherland, a town in the Eemsmond municipality
 Breede Water Management Area in South Africa
 Breede River in South Africa